Handschuheim is a commune in the Bas-Rhin department in Grand Est in north-eastern France.

It lies a few kilometres to the west of Strasbourg along the old national road RN4.

See also
 Communes of the Bas-Rhin department
 Kochersberg

References

External links

 official site

Communes of Bas-Rhin
Bas-Rhin communes articles needing translation from French Wikipedia